Euzophera flagella is a species of snout moth in the genus Euzophera. It was described by Julius Lederer in 1869 and is known from Iran and Turkey.

References

Moths described in 1869
Phycitini
Moths of Asia